Itzehoe is a town in the German state of Schleswig-Holstein.

As the capital of the district Steinburg, Itzehoe is located on the Stör, a navigable tributary of the Elbe, 51 km (31.7 mi) northwest of Hamburg and 24 km (14.9 mi) north of Glückstadt. The population is about 32,530.

History
Itzehoe is the oldest town in Holstein. Its nucleus was a castle, built in 809 by Egbert, one of Charlemagne's counts, against the Danes. The community that sprang up around it was variously called Esseveldoburg, Eselsfleth and Ezeho. In 1201 the town was destroyed but it was restored in 1224. The new town was granted the Lübeck rights by Adolphus IV in 1238 and the old town in 1303. During the Thirty Years' War Itzehoe was twice destroyed by the Swedes, in 1644 and 1657, but was rebuilt on each occasion. It passed to Prussia in 1867, with the duchy of Schleswig-Holstein.

Itzehoe is listed as a garrison depot (Wehrkreis X, Hamburg) of the former Infanteriedivision 225, which was implicated in the 1940 Vinkt Massacre in Belgium.

Sights
The Church of St. Laurentii and the building in which the Holstein estates formerly met are noteworthy. The town has a convent founded in 1256, many schools, a hospital and other benevolent institutions.

Itzehoe is also the location of the Wenzel Hablik Museum.

Transport
Itzehoe is situated at the Marsh Railway and offers connections to Hamburg and the island of Sylt.

During the period up to and including the Wacken Open Air festival many festival goers depart for the festival from Itzehoe using the 'Metal Shuttle Bus’, which leaves from near Itzehoe station. During this time the town can become very overcrowded and inundated with traffic.

Twin towns – sister cities

Itzehoe is twinned with:
 Cirencester, England, United Kingdom
 La Couronne, France
 Pasłęk, Poland

Notable people
Carl Julian (von) Graba (1799–1874), German lawyer and ornithologist who visited and studied the Faroe Islands
Bruno Adler (1896–1954), Bishop of the German Christians
Hans-Joachim Newiger (1925–2011), philologist
H. G. Francis (1936–2011), writer
Sabine Sinjen (1942–1995), actress
Jerzy Janeczek (1944–2021), Polish actor
Antje Blumenthal (born 1947), politician
Sylvia Convey (born 1948), Latvian-Australian artist
Olaf Berner (born 1949), teacher and handball player
Heiger Ostertag (born 1953), historian
Thomas Gerull (born 1962), fencer, Olympic medalist
Sven Butenschön (born 1976), ice hockey player
Lisa Tomaschewsky (born 1988), actress

References

External links
Itzehoe Notgeld (emergency banknotes) depicting the inflation of staple prices in Germany between 1913–1921

Towns in Schleswig-Holstein
Steinburg